The Battle of Goldsborough Bridge took place on December 17, 1862, in Wayne County, North Carolina, as part of the Union expedition to Goldsboro, North Carolina, during the American Civil War.

Background
In December 1862, both the Union Army and Confederate forces desired to secure the strategically significant Wilmington and Weldon Railroad Bridge. On December 17, an expedition under Union Maj. Gen. John G. Foster reached the railroad near Everettsville, aiming to destroy this bridge in order to put an end to the vital supply chain from the port of Wilmington.

Battle

Foster's men began destroying the tracks north toward the Goldsborough Bridge. Clingman's Confederate brigade delayed the advance, but was unable to prevent the destruction of the bridge. Foster's troops overpowered the small number of defending Confederate soldiers and successfully burned down the bridge. His mission accomplished, Foster departed to return to their base at New Bern. On their way back, Foster's men were again attacked by Confederate forces, but they repulsed the assault, taking far fewer casualties than the enemy.

Aftermath
Foster arrived at his camp on December 20. Total casualties for the campaign (All three engagements at Kinston, White Hall, and Goldsboro) were: Federal 577 (90 killed, 478 wounded and 9 missing/captured) Confederate casualties were reported at 738 (71 killed, 268 wounded and 400 missing/captured)

References

External links
 Goldsborough Bridge Battlefield
 CWSAC Report Update

Goldsboro Bridge
Goldsboro Bridge
Goldsboro Bridge
Goldsboro Bridge
Wayne County, North Carolina
1862 in the American Civil War
1862 in North Carolina
December 1862 events